KK Crn Drim Green Mobile  is a Macedonian basketball club based in Struga, North Macedonia.

History
Crn Drim as a club based in Struga, is famous as one of the most popular clubs in Southwest part of Macedonia. During the last decades it has promoted huge number of young talents.

Their first appearance in first tier was in 2003–2004 season, when KK Ohrid 98 refused the offer to get the wild card to compete in First League, and Crn Drim filled the place. In their first season in first tier, they changed the name to MM Koledz because of sponsorship of the fellow college and they finished on 7th place in the regular season and secured place for the next season. In the 2004–2005 season, FON University became sponsor of the team and it was named KK FON and it was the best season team from Struga ever had. They finished 5th in the regular season and after the super league they finished 4th and secured place in play-off. In the play-off semifinal they won first game against the first team after the regular season and super league Feršped Rabotnički, but lost next two games and were eliminated. In the 2005–2006 season, Crn Drim has finished on the 7th place in the regular season, but after the play-out phase they were eliminated to Macedonian Second League.

After 14 years competing in Macedonian Second League and Macedonian Third League, in the 2019–2020 season, Crn Drim was placed at first place in the Macedonian Second League when the season was suspended because of the COVID-19 pandemic. The Basketball Federation has decided to promote them to Macedonian First League.

Honours
Macedonian Second League (West)
 Winners: 2020 (promoted)

Current squad

Depth chart

References

External links
Official Facebook Page
Team info at EuroBasket

Macedonian First League (basketball)
Basketball teams in North Macedonia
Basketball teams established in 2003
Struga